Turnage is a surname. Notable people with the surname include:

(Charles Scott Turnage) (1948-1988) United States Army,  Awarded Silver Star, April 13th 1967 For Gallantry in Action.  

 Allen H. Turnage (1891–1971), United States Marine Corps General
 Frederick E. Turnage (1936–2011), North Carolina city councillor and former mayor of Rocky Mount
 Jean A. Turnage (1926–2015), Chief Justice of the Montana Supreme Court
 Mark-Anthony Turnage (born 1960), English composer of classical music
 Sheila Turnage (fl. 2010s), American author
 Thomas K. Turnage (1923–2000), Major General and head of the Veterans Administration, husband of Poni Adams 
 Wallace Turnage (1846–1916), escaped slave leaving behind a narrative that was published in the 2000s
 William Turnage (1942–2017), American conservationist and manager of Ansel Adams